Ramel "Smooth" Bradley (born February 5, 1985) is a retired American professional basketball player who last played for Ankara DSİ of the Turkish Basketball First League. He played college basketball at the University of Kentucky.

High school
Bradley attended Manhattan Park West High School in New York City under coach Abram White, where he averaged 20.0 points, 8.0 rebounds and 6.0 assists per game as a senior. From there he spent a year at the Pendleton School at IMG  Academy in Florida. He was then offered a scholarship to play at Kentucky, and was part of the recruiting class that included All-Americans Rajon Rondo,  Joe Crawford, and Randolph Morris.

College
Although he was not a starter as a freshman, he played in every game and averaged 5.8 points per game during Southeastern Conference play. By his sophomore season, he was averaging 7.9 points per game, but was forced out with a broken left hand towards the end of the season. He averaged 13.4 points during his junior season, and opted to return for his senior season, despite the departure of Tubby Smith. 
Bradley exploded to average 20+ PPG in SEC play his senior season.

After college
Ramel Bradley was invited by the New Jersey Nets to play in the NBA Summer League, because the New Jersey Nets liked his effort he gave in workouts and other basketball camps in which Bradley participated. 
He started playing European basketball in Zagreb, Croatia for the Cedevita Zagreb team, where he wore the number twelve. Ramel averaged 15.1 points and 2.4 assists during 2008–2009 season with Cedevita.

On June 28, 2009, Ramel Bradley signed with a French PRO-A team JDA Dijon. He played the entire 2009–2010 season with the team, averaging 12.0 points, 3.7 assists, 2.7 rebounds and 1.0 steal per appearance.

On August 10, 2010, Bradley signed to play for the Israeli team Maccabi Ashdod. After the eighteenth game of the season Bradley suffered a knee injury that forced him to undergo a surgery and miss the rest of the season.

On January 26, 2012, after playing twelve games for Maccabi Ashdod at the beginning of 2011–2012 season, Bradley signed with the team of Hapoel Jerusalem. He had his debut on the 29th with a winning of Hapoel over Barak Netanya.

On August 5, 2012, after playing the last season at Maccabi Ashdod and Hapoel Jerusalem, Bradley stayed in the Israeli Top League, and signed to play for Barak Netanya.

Non-basketball activities
Bradley, who graduated from UK with a degree in agriculture, has moved back to Kentucky in 2017 and is with an organization in eastern Kentucky called AppHarvest that is promoting agriculture in Appalachia.  They are building greenhouses, as well as educating high school students in agriculture.

References

External links 
Eurobasket.com Profile
FIBA.com Profile
RealGM.com Profile
TBLStat.net Profile

1985 births
Living people
African-American basketball players
American expatriate basketball people in Croatia
American expatriate basketball people in France
American expatriate basketball people in Israel
American expatriate basketball people in Turkey
Basketball players from New York City
Hapoel Jerusalem B.C. players
Hapoel Holon players
JDA Dijon Basket players
KK Cedevita players
Kentucky Wildcats men's basketball players
Maccabi Ashdod B.C. players
Point guards
Türk Telekom B.K. players
Yeşilgiresun Belediye players
American men's basketball players
21st-century African-American sportspeople
20th-century African-American people